Portable Sounds, stylized as (portable sounds), is the third full-length studio album from Christian pop rock and hip hop artist tobyMac. It was released on February 20, 2007,The album serves as a follow-up to his 2004 album: Welcome to Diverse City (2004). The album debuted at No. 10 on the Billboard 200. The album includes the singles "Lose My Soul", "Made to Love", "Boomin'", "I'm for You", and "One World (featuring Siti Monroe)". This album took a slightly different direction than tobyMac's previous hip hop efforts, having more of a pop sound. When it was released on iTunes, users were able to download a behind-the-scenes making of the album video, a digital booklet, and an acoustic version of "Made to Love". "Ignition" was selected as the theme song to the WWE pay-per-view Elimination Chamber 2011.

Release 
Portable Sounds was released on February 20, 2007, through ForeFront Records. It debuted at No. 10 on the Billboard 200, tobyMac's highest chart position as a solo artist, selling 51,000 copies in its first week. In its second week on the Billboard 200, Portable Sounds fell to No. 38, in its third week to No. 47, and in its fourth week it fell to No. 63.

A deluxe edition was released on October 23, 2007, added a DVD containing all five music videos, behind-the-scenes footage, and remixes of "Ignition" and "Boomin'". On November 14, 2008, the album was certified Gold by the RIAA.

After the album was put out Toby went on tour.  He did the tour with Thousand Foot Krutch and BarlowGirl.  On their show in Cypress, Texas, they recorded their Grammy Award winning album, Alive and Transported.

Singles
"Made to Love" reached No. 1 on Billboard'''s Hot Christian Songs chart. It was also No. 1 for 9 consecutive weeks on R&R's Christian Hit Radio (CHR) Chart and was the second most played song on Christian CHR radio stations in 2007. It reached No. 3 on R&R's Christian AC Chart.
"Boomin" was the only single to have an official music video. This video won a GMA Dove Award. On radio it charted only on the lower half of R&R's Christian Rock Radio chart.
"I'm for You" reached No. 2 on Billboards Hot Christian Songs chart. It also was No. 1 for 8 consecutive weeks on R&R's Christian Hit Radio Chart and was the third most played song on Christian CHR radio stations in 2007. It reached No. 10 on R&R's Christian AC Chart. It also appeared in the soundtrack of Thrillville: Off The Rails
"One World" reached No. 10 on Billboard'''s Hot Christian Songs chart. It was also No. 1 for 3 non consecutive weeks on R&R's Christian Hit Radio Chart. It was the seventh most-played song on R&R magazine's Christian CHR chart for 2008. A remix of "One World" appears on the Hip Hope Hits 2009 compilation and features a verse from KJ-52.
"Lose My Soul" reached No. 2 on Billboards Hot Christian Songs chart, and No. 9 on iTunes.
"No Ordinary Love" and "Ignition" were both released as singles around late 2008.
"Ignition" was used during the Arizona Cardinals entrance in Super Bowl XLIII. The track was also used during the 2008 MLB season as the walk-up song for Tampa Bay Rays outfielder, Ben Zobrist. It was also the official theme song of WWE Elimination Chamber 2011.

Track listing

History

Portable Sounds was tobyMac's first top 10 on the Billboard 200 (debuting at No. 10), and is his third longest studio album, by track listing and duration.

Personnel

Toby McKeehan – vocals, guitar, programming, production
Christopher Stevens – keyboards, programming, guitars, bass, organ, drums, backing vocals, production
Jamie Moore – drums, programming, production
Dave Wyatt – keyboards, programming
Cary Barlowe – guitars, keyboards
Brent Milligan – bass
Tony Morra – drums
Todd "TC" Collins – keyboards, programming
Byron "Mr. TalkBox" Chambers – vocoder, keyboards
Joe Weber – guitars
Mike "DJ Maj" Allen – turntables, keyboards, samples
Brian Haley – drums
Todd Lawton – bass
Michael Ripoll – guitar
Javier Solis – percussion
Ben Phillips – drums
Justin York – guitars, backing vocals
Tim Rosenau – guitar
Rica Wright – bass
Will Sayles – drums
Ric Robbins – turntables, programming, samples
Paul Moak – guitar
Trevor McNevan – guitar
Jeremy Lutito – drums
David Davidson, John Catchings, David Angell, Kristin Wilkinson – string section
Roy Agee, Mark Douthit, Mike Haynes – brass section
Siti Monroe – vocals
Mandisa – backing vocals
Alisa Turner – backing vocals
Gabriel Patillo – backing vocals, beatbox
Nirva Dorsaint-Ready – backing vocals, choir
Troma – backing vocals
Jason Eskridge – backing vocals
Calvin Nowell – backing vocals
Seth Ready – backing vocals, choir
Ayiesha Woods – backing vocals, choir
MOC – backing vocals
Donnie Lewis-Payne – choir
Donald Woods – choir
Chris Bullard -choir

Music videos

Charts

Weekly charts

Year-end charts

Singles

Certifications

Accolades
In 2008, the album won a Dove Award for Rock/Contemporary Album of the Year at the 39th GMA Dove Awards.

References

External links 
 Portable Sounds webpage

ForeFront Records albums
TobyMac albums
2007 albums
Albums produced by TobyMac